Temnosternus catulus is a species of beetle in the family Cerambycidae. It was first described by McKeown in 1942. It is known from Australia.

References

Tmesisternini
Beetles described in 1942